Route 66 Raceway is a motorsports facility located in Joliet, Illinois, United States, which consists of a  dragstrip and a  dirt oval racetrack. The facility is owned and operated by NASCAR and is located adjacent to Chicagoland Speedway.

History
The  facility was built in 1998, funded by nine local entrepreneurs headed by Indy car owner Dale Coyne. The inaugural season saw 90 days of racing activity between the two tracks. In 1999, ISC partnered with the founders of the facility when it purchased  of land adjacent to the facility to build Chicagoland Speedway.

The quarter-mile, $20 million drag strip features a four-story, 38-suite complex. The 30,000-seat grandstand surrounds the start line and features 40 rows of fully backed seats. In 2010, the dragstrip was repaved.

The dirt oval was shortened to a 3/8 mile facility in 2017, since then the dirt track has seen a resurgence with top-flight series such as the World of Outlaws returning to the facility. 

However, in 2022 the dirt oval posted a full card of events, including concerts. Then, for no explained reason they removed the concerts and then canceled race events one-by-one about a week before the event was to take place. On-Line tickets have been sold for these events, and there have been reports of people having trouble getting refunds. As of July 27, 2022, onlLine tickets for supposed upcoming events are now not for sale.

Events
The dragstrip hosted a round of the NHRA Camping World Drag Racing Series from 1998 to 2019, and is scheduled to return in 2023. The AMA Supercross Championship raced there in 2000 on a Daytona-style course on the dragstrip.

The dirt oval track has hosted the All Star Circuit of Champions in 1998, 2018, 2019 and 2021, the World of Outlaws Sprint Car Series from 1998 to 2002 and later in 2005 and 2017, the World of Outlaws Late Model Series in 2017, the USAC National Sprint Car Championship and USAC National Midget Series from 2001 to 2004, and the latter again in 2019. Route 66 has also hosted American Flat Track and TORC: The Off Road Championship events, as well as monster truck shows and demolition derbies.

References

External links
 Official Website
 The Dirt Oval at Route 66 Raceway at The Third Turn

Motorsport venues in Illinois
NHRA Division 3 drag racing venues
Sports venues in Joliet, Illinois
Buildings and structures on U.S. Route 66
Off-road racing venues in the United States